The 1991 Chatham Cup was the 64th annual nationwide knockout football competition in New Zealand.

Up to the last 16 of the competition, the cup was run in three regions (northern, central, and southern), with an open draw from the quarter-finals on. National League teams received a bye until the third round (last 64). In all, a record 174 teams took part in the competition.

Tawa reached the final 16 by unusual means. They were defeated by New Plymouth Old Boys in the third round, but New Plymouth Old Boys were disqualified after the draw for the final 32 was made, which would have seen them playing against Rongotai College. Tawa were reinstated as winners of the third round match, but Rongotai refused to play against them, claiming that they should have been awarded the match against NPOB by default. Tawa were thus deemed to have won the fourth round game by a walkover.

The 1991 final
The league/cup double was completed for the fifth time, with Christchurch United becoming the second club to achieve the feat twice, having previously won the double in 1975. This was the last occasion that the double was won with the old New Zealand National Soccer League, as this was disbanded at the end of the 1992 season.

Results

Third Round

* Won on penalties by Ngongotaha (6-5), Stop Out (4-1), and Waterside (5-3)
† New Plymouth OB disqualified for rule infringement

Fourth Round

* Won on penalties by Stop Out (8-7)

Fifth Round

Sixth Round

* Won on penalties by Wellington United (5-4)

Semi-finals

Final

References

Rec.Sport.Soccer Statistics Foundation New Zealand 1991 page
UltimateNZSoccer website 1991 Chatham Cup page

Chatham Cup
Chatham Cup
Chatham Cup